is a town located in Yazu District, Tottori Prefecture, Japan. , the town had an estimated population of 6,438 in 2699 households and a population density of 29 persons per km².

Geography
Located in the southeastern part of Tottori Prefecture, mountains and forests occupy 93% of the town area, and it is designated as a heavy snowfall area.

Neighboring  municipalities 
Tottori Prefecture
Tottori
Wakasa
Yazu
Okayama Prefecture
Tsuyama
Mimasaka
Nagi
Nishiawakura

Climate
Chizu has a humid climate (Köppen Cfa) characterized by warm, wet summers and cold winters with heavy snowfall.

Demography
Per Japanese census data, the population of Chizu has been as follows. The population has been steadily declining since the 1950s

History 
Chizu is part of ancient Inaba Province. The temple of Gokuraku-ji was founded in 646 AD. During the Edo period, the area was part of the holdings of Tottori Domain ruled by a branch of the Ikeda clan from their seat at Tottori Castle.  Yazu District, Tottori was established after the Meiji restoration and the village of Chizu was established with the creation of the modern municipalities system on October 1,1889. It was elevated to town status on June 1, 1914. Chizu annexed the neighboring villages of Yamagata, Nagi and Haji on February 20, 1935, Tomizawa on February 26, 1936 and Yamago on June , 1954.

Government
Chizu has a mayor-council form of government with a directly elected mayor and a unicameral town council of 12 members. Chizu, collectively with the other municipalities of Yazu District, contributes two members to the Tottori Prefectural Assembly. In terms of national politics, the town is part of Tottori 1st district of the lower house of the Diet of Japan.

Economy
The main industry in the area is logging, woodworking, tourism, and brewing.

Education
Chizu has one public elementary school and one public junior high school operated by the town government, and one public high school operated by the Tottori Prefectural Board of Education.

Transportation

Railway 
 JR West - Inbi Line
  -  -

Wakasa Railway - Wakasa Line
  -  -

Highways 
  Tottori Expressway

Sister city relations
 -  Yanggu County, Gangwon, South Korea, since October 10, 1999

Local attractions
Ishitani Family Residence - Important Cultural Property
Itaibara Village - Showa era buildings
Mount Nagi
 Suwa Shrine
Mitaki Dam

Noted people from Chizu
Katsumi Nishikawa, movie director

References

External links 

  

Towns in Tottori Prefecture
Chizu, Tottori